Ilias Karargyris (born 29 June 2002) is a Greek professional footballer who plays as a goalkeeper for Super League 2 club Proodeftiki.

Career 
Karargyris made his professional debut for Olympiacos in the 2019/20 season against OFI, playing barely 3 minutes after getting subbed on in the place of Bobby Allain but still conceding only 2 minutes later. Olympiacos still managed to win 3-1 but Karargyris had to wait a year in order to make his second appearance, this time against Asteras Tripolis in a Super League 2020/21 Play-Off game in which he was subbed on in the place of Konstantinos Tzolakis in the 83rd minute. This time Karargyris played 7 minutes and he managed to keep his first professional clean sheet after the game ended 0-0.

Honours

Club
Olympiacos
Super League Greece: 2019–20, 2020–21, 2021–22
Greek Cup: 2019–20

References

2002 births
Living people
Greek footballers
Greece youth international footballers
Super League Greece players
Olympiacos F.C. players
Association football goalkeepers
Footballers from Nafplion